The Tellers are a rock group from Belgium.

Ben Baillieux-Beynon started the band in 2005, originally with Nic Van Assche. Van Assche was then replaced by Charles Blistin. In 2006 they recorded the More EP. The band rapidly gained popularity. Their first full-length album, 'Hands Full of Ink,' was released at the end of 2007 and was followed by an intensive European tour. At the same time, the Tellers added band members Kenley Dratwa (drums) and Francis Gustin (bass).

After a two-year tour with this ensemble, the band split, reverting to its original duo. Soon after, members Beynon and Blistin parted amicably. Beynon soon added three new members to the band - Fabrice Detry (bass), Cesar Laloux (drums), and Joos Houwen (guitar).

Although the band only emerged recently, (having released two albums), the group has achieved fame in  Belgium, where their album Hands full of ink reached 7th in the charts. They have also had success in Germany, the Netherlands and most recently in France in part due to advertising for Canon .

The song More was included in the soundtrack of EA Sports game, FIFA 08 and was featured in an ANZ Bank advertisement in Australia.

They recorded their EP in the studio of 62TV Records (home of Girls in Hawaii).

Discography

Albums
The Tellers

More (2006) EP
 More
 Girls of Russia
 Second Category
 I Lie
 Jacknife
 Turn Back Around
 This World

Hands full of ink (2007)
 Die With Me / If I Say
 More
 Want You Back
 Penny
 Confess
 Darkest Door
 Prince Charly
 Too Doo
 Hugo
 He Gets High
 A Bit Of Glue
 Second Category
 Memory
 Holiness / Saintete
 Me Boy
 Another Coin For...

Close the Evil Eye (2010)
 Drama
 Evil Eye
 Like I Say
 Secrets
 Silent Hills
 Salt
 Cold as Ice
 I've Got A World
 Friends Of Mine
 I Wish
 7 Words

Singles
 2006 : More
 2006 : Second Category
 2007 : Hugo
 2007 : If I say
 2007 : Memory
 2008 : Holiness'featuring Coby-Rae
 2010 : Like I say / Cold as Ice
 2010 : I've Got A World

References and notes

External links
Official website

Belgian rock music groups